Avrum Rosensweig is the founding director of Ve'ahavta: The Canadian Jewish Humanitarian & Relief Committee. As the son of a rabbi, Avrum was greatly affected by the wars in the Balkans and Rwanda in the early 1990s. He decided then, it was paramount the Canadian Jewish community had a humanitarian organization dedicated to living up the Jewish promise of 'never again', that the community would respond when an injustice or disaster occurred. In 1996, Avrum founded Ve'ahavta (Hebrew for 'and you should love'), a non-profit charity with a mission to encourage all Jews, and all peoples, to play a role in tikun olam, repairing the world. In 2016, Avrum stepped down as CEO and took on the position of Founder & Ambassador, speaking, fundraising and furthering the mission of Ve'ahavta. 

Avrum spent ten years on commercial radio in Toronto as the co-host and producer of a quirky show about food and restaurants called: Marty & Avrum: The Food Guys. Avrum and his partner, Marty spent five years at Talk 640 radio, and the subsequent five years at CFRB1010. The two also did a stint at CHFI.  now hosts and produces HatRadio!, a podcast in which he interviews regular folks about their lives and feelings about life. The show had a strong commercial and cult following.

Today, in 2019, Avrum is the producer and host of HatRadio!, a podcast found at Hatradio.ca and on podbean.com and where podcasts are heard.  On HatRadio!, Avrum conducts in-depth interviews with people of all backgrounds about their lives, upbringing, and fascinating and compelling things that  happened to them over the years. Some of his guests include: David Shore, creator/writer for 'House' and 'The Good Doctor', TVO star interviewer, Steve Paikin; Pat Rush, former guitarist with Jonny Winter and Jeff Healey; Avrum's son's bar mitzvah teacher; Massimo Capra, famed Canadian chef; Joseph Pusuma, a Roma man who lived in a church with his family for three years so as not to be deported to Hungary where they had been beaten by neo-Nazis, etc.

Background 

Rosensweig was born in Kitchener, Ontario in 1960, the only son of Rabbi Phyvle (Philip) Rosensweig (1928–1989) and Gitel Rosensweig (née Flicht) (1930–2016)

Rabbi Phillip Rosensweig came from a family of Orthodox Rabbis, that emigrated to Canada during the turn of the last century. Some of his mother's family were Polish Jews from  Wierzbnik (after 1952 called Starachowice), Poland, who were murdered in the Holocaust.

In his younger years, Rabbi Rosensweig was active in helping Jewish refugees from Europe flee persecution to come to Canada.

Rosensweig received an Orthodox Jewish education at Ner Israel Yeshiva in Toronto and later on in Jerusalem, Israel, followed by the study of journalism at Ryerson University.  From 1990 to 1996, he worked for Toronto's United Jewish Appeal (UJA) campaign. During the 1994 Rwandan civil war, he convinced UJA in Toronto to launch efforts to help refugees fleeing the war-torn region.

From 2005 to 2015, he served as associate Religious Leader at Congregation Habonim Toronto.

Ve'ahavta 

In  1996,  he co-founded Ve'ahavta with Stephen Epstein. The NGO is Canada's only Jewish humanitarian and relief organization. Ve'ahavta then launched numerous initiatives in Canada and around the world.

In its first 15 years of operations, Ve'ahavta operated around the world assisting locals through medical care. Ve'ahavta medical teams set up clinics in the rain forests of Guyana, in rural Zimbabwe, Guyana and responded to natural disasters in Turkey, Sri Lanka following the 2004 tsunami, Haiti, Honduras and other such places. Similarly, Ve'ahavta launched a local program for those experiencing homelessness and poverty. Avrum helped establish programs such as:  The Mobile Jewish Response to the Homeless, a nightly van program whereby volunteers travel the streets of Toronto, with outreach workers, to assist those living on the street through food, drinks, clothing, blankets, books etc.;  The Ve'ahavta Street Academy, a school for the homeless or near homeless and the Creative Writing Contest for the Homeless. Some of the judges for their program included:  Michael Ondaatje and former prime minister of the UK, Tony Blair. Ve'ahavta has operated homework clubs and photography contests.

Other areas of operation included South America, the Caribbean, in Asia (during a tsunami in Thailand and a hurricane in the Philippines), and communities in rural Africa (affected by AIDS), and advocating awareness about the genocide in Darfur. Locally, he has initiated many programs for the disadvantaged in Toronto (Passover Seder for the Homeless (co-sponsored by Toronto's Congregation Habonim), Creative Writing Contest for the Homeless, Homework Partnership Program for Somalian Children etc.), as well as forming alliances with the Jewish and First Nations communities.

Ve'ahavta hosts a gala fundraising event each year, honouring Canadians of all backgrounds for their work in social, humanitarian, medical and educational fields.
Honourees have included:
Moshe Hammer, Dr. Naomi Azrieli, Dr. Michael Dan, Irwin Cotler, Karen Levine, Adam Hummel and others.

Hosts, Guest speakers/performers have included:
Bob Geldof, Mia Farrow, Mariane Pearl, Steven Page,   Emmanuel Jal, Jaffa Road, Michael Enright, Shad (Shadrach Kabango), Evan Solomon and others.

Media presence 

Rosensweig's  work has appeared in various print, TV and Radio Media including:

Weekly column in the Canadian Jewish News
Contributing columnist for Haaretz.com
CFRB1010 Talk Show co-Host - "Marty & Avrum: The Food Guys"
Talk 640 Talk Show co-Host - "Marty & Avrum: The Food Guys"
TV Show co-Host (Marty Galin) - "The Moveable Feast"
Israel Today Radio Show Host (with Shimon Zeraviv)
Blogger, Huffington Post

References 

Living people
1960 births
People from Kitchener, Ontario
Canadian Jews
Canadian people of Polish-Jewish descent